Stelios "Alex" Koukouravas (born 7 April 1998) is a Welsh professional basketball player who currently plays for the Surrey Scorchers in the British Basketball League.

College career 
Koukouravas spent two years with South Gloucestershire and Stroud College and the Bristol Flyers Academy, before signing a scholarship with Victory Rock Prep in August 2016.

A year later, he joined the University of Surrey, where professional team the Surrey Scorchers play their home games. During his time at university, he represented Team Surrey Basketball in British Universities and Colleges Sport.

Professional career 
In September 2018, Koukouravas joined British Basketball League team the Surrey Scorchers.

International career 
Koukouravas has captained the Welsh national team at Under-16, Under-18 and Under-23 level.

References 

1998 births
Living people
British Basketball League players
British men's basketball players
Point guards
Sportspeople from Cardiff
Surrey Scorchers players
Welsh men's basketball players